The Court Martial Appeal Court of Canada (CMAC) hears appeals from Courts-martial of Canada ("courts martial").

In Canada, courts martial are presided over by independent military judges from the office of the Chief Military Judge. They have the jurisdiction to try military personnel, and those civilian personnel that accompany military personnel abroad, for crimes that contravene the Code of Service Discipline and the National Defence Act; which incorporates many of the offences under the Criminal Code and related statutes.

The CMAC was established in 1959 by Parliament under the National Defence Act, to replace the Court Martial Appeal Board.  Due to the court's small caseload, justices of the CMAC are cross-appointed from justices of provincial superior courts and the Federal Court and Federal Court of Appeal.  Appeals from the CMAC lie with the Supreme Court of Canada.  Appeals require leave from the Supreme Court, unless a justice of the CMAC dissents on a question of law, in which case there is an appeal as of right to the Supreme Court.

See also
United States Court of Appeals for the Armed Forces

References

External links
Official site
Office of the Chief Military Judge

1959 establishments in Ontario
Canadian appellate courts
Military courts of appeal
Courts martial of Canada
Courts and tribunals established in 1959